Superior Coach was a coachbuilder in the American automotive industry. Founded in 1909 as the Garford Motor Truck Company, Superior is best known for constructing bodies for professional cars (hearses) and school buses. Following major downturns in both segments in the late 1970s, Superior was liquidated by its parent company in 1980. From 1925 to 1980, the company was based in Lima, Ohio.

After its 1980 closure, the Superior name would live on through several other companies.  The manufacturing of school buses would play a part of the formation of Mid Bus (acquired by Collins Industries in 2008) and the professional car operations would remain in Lima as part of Accubuilt.

Garford Motor Truck Company (1909-1925)

In 1909, the Garford Motor Truck Company was established in Elyria, Ohio, a small town 30 miles outside Cleveland.

By June 1912, the company was awarded a lucrative contract with the United States Post Office. The first order called for 11 trucks, the following for 20 trucks, for a total of 31 trucks. "This is very significant of the practical efficiency of this most advanced commercial car." The post office had experimented for two years "with practically every truck made." They tried not only all the leading American trucks, but the foreign trucks, as well. The test resulted in the Garford being awarded first honors. The Garford proved to be the most practical truck under all conditions.

Superior Body Company (1925-1940)

During the early 1920s, Garford moved its operations to Lima, Ohio.  In 1925, Garford Motor Truck changed its name to the Superior Body Company and opened a new plant housing a large manufacturing facility and administrative offices. The company diversified, introducing a line of hearse and ambulance bodies (known as professional cars) and becoming a major producer of school bus bodies for the U.S. and Canada, as well as export markets.

For its professional-car platforms, Superior signed an agreement with Studebaker, thus gaining instant access to some 3000 dealers and Studebaker's chassis engineering.  The company had continuing success for several years, and on the strength of this arrangement, rose to a prominent position in the professional-car business. By 1930, Superior and Studebaker had the only complete line of professional cars in the North American market.

In 1938, having achieved success and having established a dealer network of its own, Superior left the partnership with Studebaker and began building bodies on General Motors platforms.

Superior Coach Company (1940-1980)

In 1940 the company changed its name again, to Superior Coach Company. School bus bodies were built primarily on Chevrolet/GMC, Dodge, Ford, and International Harvester truck chassis. In 1951 the Lima facility was expanded and a new facility in Kosciusko, Mississippi was opened.

Sheller-Globe Corporation
In 1969 Superior was acquired by the Sheller-Globe Corporation, an industrial conglomerate and auto parts maker based in Toledo, Ohio.

The 1977 model year saw a major downsizing in the Cadillac automobile chassis used for the professional car business. In addition to being smaller, Cadillac's commercial chassis was significantly more expensive. Superior and other ambulance and funeral car manufacturers had to design new bodies and retool their factories, resulting in much higher consumer costs. The ambulance sector switched to larger van-based vehicles or and truck chassis. 1977 also brought new Federal Motor Vehicle Safety Standards for school buses built after 1 April, which increased both costs and engineering challenges. At the same time, a downturn in North American school bus purchase volumes began as the children of the Baby Boom generation completed their elementary and secondary educations.

By 1980, Superior was one of the six major school bus body manufacturing companies in the United States, competing with Blue Bird, Carpenter, Thomas, Ward, and Wayne, as well as Gillig and Crown whose buses were primarily sold on the West Coast. Bidding competition for reduced volumes became devastating to profits and even liquidity; in 1979, Ward declared bankruptcy, reorganizing as AmTran the following year, which later became IC Bus.

Faced with these challenges, school bus industry overcapacity, the loss of ambulance business in the professional car sector, and decreased sales of funeral coaches due to higher production and sales costs, Sheller-Globe liquidated its Superior Coach-related investments in late 1980, and portions of its assets were sold.

Post-liquidation
After Sheller-Globe announced the closure of its Lima bus and professional car manufacturing operations in 1980, several small businesses purchased portions of the assets, and carried on successfully with several product lines.

School buses

Although large school bus manufacturing was discontinued with the 1980 model year, Mid Bus—a new small business based in Lima organized by three former employees—resumed production of the smallest Superior school buses, beginning with a workforce of seven people. The business grew successfully, and after a move to a much larger facility at Bluffton, Ohio, it was acquired by Collins Industries in 1998.

Professional cars

Superior Coaches

CarCraft

Accubuilt
In 1981 Superior's hearse business was sold to Tom Earnhart. Later that year, it was merged with the largest competitor, the S&S Coach Company. This formed a new company, S&S/Superior of Ohio, to oversee the further development of the two businesses. Manufacturing operations were consolidated at Superior's plant in Lima, which had been expanded 30 years earlier.

As of 2007, S&S/Superior now operates as a division of Accubuilt, using the Superior Coach trade name for its line of funeral cars and specialty vehicles. Accubuilt's  flagship facility was also the exclusive production plant for the  W.P. Chrysler Executive Series 300, a longer-wheelbase version of the Chrysler 300. In late 2017 Accubuilt was purchased by Sean Myers, owner of Armbruster Stageway, and was once again named S&S/Superior Coach Company.

Superior Credit Union

The credit union for the Superior Coach Company's employees, now known as Superior Credit Union, grew in the decades following the company's closure to become the fourth largest credit union in Ohio.

Bus products

Van based;

Ford Econoline
Chevrolet/GMC G30
Dodge

Type A (Partner);
Ford Econoline chassis

The partner only lasted for one year.

Type B (Pacemaker);
Chevrolet P30 chassis

Type C (Pioneer);
 Chevrolet/GMC B-Series chassis
 Ford B-Series chassis
 International Harvester Loadstar chassis (1962–1978)
 International Harvester S-series "Schoolmaster" chassis (1979–1985)

Type D (SuperCruiser)
International Harvester chassis
 front and rear-engine models

Carrollton bus disaster

In 1988, nearly a decade after Sheller-Globe exited the school bus manufacturing business, a Superior bus was involved in a disastrous crash. The bus had been built only 9 days before the more stringent 1977 Federal Motor Vehicle Safety Standards would have required better collision protection of the fuel tank, a wider central aisle for better access to the emergency door, and other safety improvements. Although no legal determination of product liability was ever made, Sheller-Globe and Ford Motor Company each contributed substantially to the settlement funds for those injured and the families of those who were killed. As of 2010, the Carrollton bus disaster remained one of the two worst bus accidents in U.S. history.

The accident and the legal battle afterward were recounted in a 1994 book by James S. Kuen. Reckless Disregard: Corporate Greed, Government Indifference, and the Kentucky School Bus Crash was published by Simon & Schuster of New York City.

See also
 Arthur Garford
 Garford-Putilov Armoured Car
 Studebaker-Garford

References

 Fundinguniverse.com: United Technologies Automotive Inc Company History

External links
 
 Superior Coach Company website – history
 Coachbilt: Superior.  – history

Coachbuilders of the United States
Defunct motor vehicle manufacturers of the United States
Defunct bus manufacturers of the United States
School bus manufacturers
Motor vehicle manufacturers based in Ohio
Lima, Ohio
Vehicle manufacturing companies established in 1909
Manufacturing companies disestablished in 1980
1909 establishments in Ohio
1980 disestablishments in Ohio
Defunct truck manufacturers of the United States
Defunct manufacturing companies based in Ohio